The 2006 European Archery Championships is  the 19th edition of the European Archery Championships. The event was held in Athens, Greece from 13 to 16 September, 2006.

Medal table

Medal summary

Recurve

Compound

References

External links
 Results

European Archery Championships
2006 in archery
International sports competitions hosted by Greece
2006 in European sport